Diggnation was a weekly humor video podcast hosted by Kevin Rose and Alex Albrecht. Broadcast on Revision3, the first episode aired on July 1, 2005 and the last episode on  December 30, 2011.

Producer David Prager suggested naming the Digg website "Diggnation". Rose decided on the simpler Digg for the website and Diggnation for the podcast.

Diggnation usually starts with Rose and Albrecht reviewing beverages.  These include beer, tea, coffee, and hard liquors such  vodka or whisky.  The hosts continue consuming the beverages for the rest of the show. Rose and Albrecht then discuss Digg stories from the previous week, with off-topic banter with each other and with Prager and camera operator Glenn McElhose.

The intro sequence to the podcast was created by Eden Soto in collaboration with Prager. It was developed over a three month period, according to Eden Soto's website.

Episodes

The show begins with a short listing of the podcast's current sponsors, followed by a humorous fake advertisement (i.e. Bose's Noise Enhancing Headphones, "Days of our Prager", Cougars: Aged to Perfection, etc.).

After the title video, the hosts introduce themselves, give the filming location, make any relevant announcements, and discuss the drinks they will have during the episode. The beer tasting and beverage aspect of Diggnation is one of the show's unique aspects.

The majority of the episode is dedicated to Rose and Albrecht discussing news items as well as providing personal commentary, anecdotes and unrelated banter. The show's humor is generally vulgar. At the end of the show, Rose and Albrecht mention their sponsors again, read the e-mail from fans, then conclude the show with a seemingly ad-libbed phrase or saying.

In more recent episodes, bigger Digg stories are discussed after the ads, but before the emails. This is keeping in line with most other Revision3 shows.

Distribution

Diggnation episodes were released weekly on Wednesdays at 6 PM (EST). Previously, the show was released on Friday at the same time for paid members, and Sunday at 12:01 for everyone. There were an estimated 250,000 regular subscribers to the show during its peak.

BitGravity handles iTunes and TiVo subscribers, downloads from the website, and RSS feeds.  Repeats, edited for content, time and profanity, are also seen on  Youtoo TV .

Diggnation hosted live shows at CES, SXSW, Reno, Nevada, Macworld, San Francisco, E3, San Diego, Hollywood, London, St. Louis, Amsterdam, San Francisco, Tokyo, Los Angeles, and New York City.

On October 3, 2011, Prager announced that Diggnation would end with its 340th episode. The Diggnation finale was broadcast on December 30, 2011 at The Music Box in Hollywood,.

Guests
Although hosting duties were typically split solely between Rose and Albrecht, a few "third-chair" guests were invited onto the program:

 Episodes 185 and  251: Jimmy Fallon
 Episode 220: Adam Savage
 Episode 231: John Hodgman

Other guests included Chris Hansen, Adam Carolla, Ashton Kutcher, WWE Diva and  Candice Michelle, Gary Vaynerchuk, Rachel Maddow, Leo Laporte, Robert Rodriguez and Tony Hawk.

Awards
 2006: Podcast Award for best technology podcast.
 2007: Best in 2007 Podcast from iTunes.
 2008: People's Voice Winner for the Technology in Online Film and Video at the Webby Awards.
 2009: Streamy Award for Best Hosted Web Series (nomination)
 2010: Streamy Award for Best Hosted Web Series (won)

Other shows 
A spin-off show, The Digg Reel ran from January 2008 to September 2010, and was originally hosted by Jessica Corbin, followed by Andrew Bancroft. The show featured the week's top user submitted videos in comparison to Diggnation's primary focus on news articles. Both were produced by Revision3.

On October 13, 2017, Rose and Albrecht released a "light Diggnation reunion" under the title of "Talking Tech", released within the  "Kevin Rose Show" podcast. In the episode, the two hosts confirmed new episodes of "Talking Tech" would be released every 4 to 5 episodes of the "Kevin Rose Show." However as of 2023, only 2 episodes were ever released and The Kevin Rose Show has since ended production in 2021.

References

External links

 Diggnation website
 Diggnation on Blip

2005 American television series debuts
2005 web series debuts
2012 American television series endings
2012 web series endings
Audio podcasts
Revision3
Streamy Award-winning channels, series or shows
Video podcasts
Technology podcasts
2012 podcast endings
2008 podcast debuts